The Wichita Falls metropolitan statistical area is a metropolitan area in North Texas that covers three counties – Archer, Clay, and Wichita. As of the 2010 census, the MSA had a population of 151,306 (though a July 1, 2011 estimate placed the population at 150,261).

Counties
Archer
Clay
Wichita

Communities

Places with more than 100,000 people
Wichita Falls (Principal City)

Places with 1,000 to 15,000 people
Archer City
Burkburnett
Electra
Henrietta
Holliday
Iowa Park

Places with 500 to 1,000 people
Byers
Lakeside City
Petrolia

Places with less than 500 people
Bellevue
Cashion Community
Dean
Jolly
Megargel
Pleasant Valley
Scotland 
Windthorst

Unincorporated places
Bluegrove 
Buffalo Springs
Dundee 
Halsell 
Haynesville 
Huff
Hurnville 
Joy 
Kamay
Mankins 
Shannon 
Stanfield 
Thornberry 
Valley View
Vashti

Demographics
As of the census of 2000, there were 151,524 people, 56,109 households, and 38,587 families residing within the MSA. The racial makeup of the MSA was 80.95% White, 8.92% African American, 0.89% Native American, 1.61% Asian, 0.08% Pacific Islander, 5.05% from other races, and 2.51% from two or more races. Hispanic or Latino of any race were 11.17% of the population.

The median income for a household in the MSA was $36,011 and the median income for a family was $42,812. Males had a median income of $29,662 versus $21,660 for females. The per capita income for the MSA was $17,542.

See also
List of cities in Texas
List of museums in North Texas
Texas census statistical areas
List of Texas metropolitan areas

References

 
Geography of Archer County, Texas
Geography of Clay County, Texas
Geography of Wichita County, Texas